IREG Observatory on Academic Ranking and Excellence (IREG Observatory) is an international Nonprofit organisation created in 2009 consisting of Universities, ranking organisations and third-party organisations associated with academics and university ranking. The organisation's secretariat is based in Warsaw, Poland.

Also, the organisation is responsible for awarding organisations with the IREG Ranking Seal of Approval acknowledging the recipient's engagement and initiatives in relation to university ranking.

Foundation and purpose 
IREG Observatory was first founded in Warsaw, Poland in 2002 and was in 2009 transformed into the non-profit organisation, IREG Observatory on Academic Ranking and Excellence, it is today. Its foundation was a result of a collaborative initiative between the UNESCO European Centre for Higher Education (UNESCO-CEPES) and a broad variety of ranking experts from different international ranking organisations.

The purpose of creating the International Ranking Expert Group (IREG) was to create a specialised community consisting of ranking analysts and experts to process a variety of issues and topics related to international university ranking.

In June 2015 it held a conference on Rankings by Subject which was considered significant.

Executive Committee

Initiatives 

IREG Ranking Seal of Approval

- The organisation is responsible for awarding organisations with the IREG Ranking Seal of Approval acknowledging the recipient's engagement and initiatives in relation to university ranking.

Berlin Principles on Ranking of Higher Education Institutions.

- The Berlin principles is list of 16 principles that has been accepted as being indicators of what defines 'good' ranking and what topics should be considered in relation to ranking.

IREG Inventory of National Rankings

- The list on national rankings is an initiative which has the purpose of gathering and displaying various rankings in order to generate easy access to ranking information.

IREG List of International Academic Awards

- This list has been composed to function as a comprehensive map of international academic awards and rank these compared to one another.

IREG Guidelines for Stakeholders of Academic Rankings

- These Guidelines have been established to improve quality, assure reliability of information, and give the users of International rankings functionality and trustworthiness in term of gathering information on the topic. Furthermore, these Guidelines are supplemented by the findings of the other IREG initiatives in order to  have a broad and comprehensive framework.

Member organisations and institutions

References 

Rankings
University and college rankings
International organisations based in Poland
University organizations
Organizations established in 2002